Andrew James Langford (born 3 July 1988 in Manchester, England) is an English footballer.

Career
Langford began his career with Morecambe in 2006 and made his first appearance in a 1–0 victory over Tranmere Rovers in the Football League Trophy on 4 September 2007.

He joined  Workington. in December 2008 ahead of the club's FA Trophy tie against King's Lynn. He then joined Droylsden in 2011.

References

External links

1988 births
Living people
Footballers from Manchester
English footballers
Association football defenders
Morecambe F.C. players
Workington A.F.C. players
Droylsden F.C. players
Northern Premier League players